Kharia is a census town and a gram panchayat in the Jalpaiguri CD block in the Jalpaiguri Sadar subdivision of the Jalpaiguri district  in the state of West Bengal, India.

Geography

Location

The map of the Jalpaiguri CD block on page 393 in the District Census Handbook, Jalpaiguri, 2011 census, shows Kharia spread around the west side of Jalpauguri city.

Demographics
According to the 2011 Census of India, Kharia had a total population of 61,661 of which 31,510 (51%) were males and 30,151 (49%) were females. There were 6,666 persons in the age range of 0 to 6 years. The total number of literate people in Kharia was 43,498 (79.09% of the population over 6 years).

Infrastructure
According to the District Census Handbook 2011, Jalpaiguri, Kharia covered an area of 58.0255 km2. Among the civic amenities, the protected water supply involved tap water from untreated sources, hand pump. It had 5,886 domestic electric connections. Among the medical facilities it had 13 dispensary/ health centres, 3 family welfare centres, 1 maternity and child welfare centre, 2 veterinary hospitals, 13 medicine shops. Among the educational facilities it had 27 primary schools, 6 middle schools, 9 secondary schools, 5 senior secondary schools, the nearest general degree college at Jalpaiguri 6 km away. It had 13 non-formal education centres (Sarva Shiksha Abhiyan).

References

Cities and towns in Jalpaiguri district